Governor Campbell may refer to:

Archibald Campbell (British Army officer, born 1739) (1739–1791), Governor of Georgia from 1778 to 1779, Governor of Jamaica from 1781 to 1784, and Governor of Madras from 1786 to 1789
Carroll A. Campbell Jr. (1940–2005), 112th Governor of South Carolina
Colin Campbell (British Army officer, born 1754) (1754–1814), Acting Governor of Gibraltar from 1809 to 1814
Colin Campbell (British Army officer, born 1776) (1776–1847), 8th Governor of British Ceylon from 1841 to 1847
David Campbell (British Army officer) (1869–1936), Governor and Commander-in-Chief Malta from 1931 to 1936
David Campbell (Virginia politician) (1779–1859), 27th Governor of Virginia
Sir Donald Campbell, 1st Baronet (1800–1850), 10th Governor of Prince Edward Island from 1847 to 1850
Henry Dundas Campbell (1798–1872), Governor of Sierra Leone from 1835 to 1837
James Campbell (governor) (died 1835), Acting Governor of British Ceylon from 1822 to 1824
Jack M. Campbell (1916–1999), 21st Governor of New Mexico
James E. Campbell (1843–1924), 38th Governor of Ohio
John Allen Campbell (1835–1880), 1st Governor of the Wyoming Territory
John Campbell (Royal Navy officer) (1720–1790), Commodore Governor of Newfoundland from 1782 to 1785
John Campbell, 4th Earl of Loudoun (1705–1782), Governor General of Virginia from 1756 to 1757 and Governor of Edinburgh Castle from 1763 to 1782
Lord Neill Campbell (1630–1692), Acting Governor of East New Jersey in 1686
Thomas Edward Campbell (1878–1944), 2nd Governor of Arizona
Thomas Mitchell Campbell (1856–1923), 24th Governor of Texas
William B. Campbell (1807–1867), 14th Governor of Tennessee
William Campbell (British Army officer and Governor) (died 1796), Governor of Bermuda in 1796
Lord William Campbell (died 1778), Governor of Nova Scotia from 1766 to 1773